Abu al-Abbas al-Azafi or in full Abu al-Abbas Ahmad abu Abdallah Muhammad ibn Ahmad al-Lakhmi al-Sabti (1162–1236) was a religious and legal scholar and member of the Banu al-Azafi who ruled Ceuta in the 13th century. Al-Azafi was an expert in the analysis of oral tradition (riwaya wa diraya). He wrote a biography of the Berber saint Sidi Abu Yaaza Yalnour ibn Maymun ibn Abdallah Dukkali Hazmiri al-Gharbi (d. 1177): Di'amat al-yaqin fi za'amat al-muttaqin (The Pillar of certainty in the leadership of the God-conscious). His most important work is Kitab ad-durr al-munazzam fi i ‘l-mawlid al-mu’azzam. It was completed, after his death, by his son Abu l’Qasim. Al-Azafi established the custom of celebrating Mawlid in Ceuta. His son Abu'l-Qasim propagated it throughout the Maghreb.

References

Moroccan writers
12th-century Moroccan writers
13th-century Moroccan writers
Moroccan Maliki scholars
Moroccan biographers
People from Ceuta
12th-century jurists
13th-century jurists